Tournesol Media Entertainment (TMTV) is an American record label and  film production company, setting the stage for cross-border music and films. Their debut documentary 'A Donde Vas?' was an official selection at the San Diego Latin Film Festival of 2011,. The name Tournesol is derived from Sunflower in French, communicating the values and direction of the organization seeking culturally awakening topics, themes and production. The media organization has been known to cross-promote artists and branding in the United States, Latin America and Europe.

References

External links 
 

Film production companies of Mexico